Tom Upham (born May 2, 1943) is an American skier. He competed in the Nordic combined event at the 1968 Winter Olympics.

References

External links
 

1943 births
Living people
American male Nordic combined skiers
Olympic Nordic combined skiers of the United States
Nordic combined skiers at the 1968 Winter Olympics
Sportspeople from Lewiston, Maine